Witham is a place in England.

Witham is also a surname, as is Whitham. Notable people with these surnames include:
Dick Witham (1915–1999), professional soccer player
George Witham (1655–1725), English Roman Catholic bishop
Henry Witham (1779–1844), English paleontologist
Myron E. Witham (1880–1973), American football player, coach of football and baseball
Robert Witham (1667–1738), English biblical scholar
Thomas Witham (c.1420–1489), English Chancellor of the Exchequer under Kings Henry VI and Edward IV
William Witham, (fl.1450–1472), English clergyman
Whitham
Charles Whitham (1873–1940), author of book on Western Tasmania
Elena Whitham (born 1974), British politician
Gerald Beresford Whitham (1927–2014), British–born American mathematician
Jack Whitham (born 1946), English (soccer) footballer
James Whitham (born 1966), English motorcycle racer
Jeff Whitham, Republican member of the Kansas House of Representatives
John Whitham (1881–1952), Australian Army officer
Michael Whitham (1867–1924), English (soccer) footballer
Thomas Whitham (1888–1924), English recipient of the Victoria Cross
Vic Whitham (1894–1962), English footballer

Surnames of British Isles origin